Newport Market (also known as Newport Provisions Market) is a traditional Victorian indoor market, in Newport, South Wales. It is an early example of a large-span cast iron-frame building featuring a glass-filled barrel roof.

Newport bus station is located immediately outside the Upper Dock Street entrance to Newport Market and a short walk from Newport railway station.

It re-opened in March 2022 as a multi purpose food, retail and office space following a £5-6 million pound renovation.

History
A market building had occupied the High Street end of the site from around 1817, but was too small by the middle of the century, and was extended to the new Dock Street in 1865. It was then demolished and rebuilt. 

In 1885 the Corporation of Newport purchased the site from the Duke of Beaufort and built the present building. The foundations for the present office buildings and tower at the Dock Street end were laid on 13 September 1887 and they were opened by the then Mayor of Newport Henry Faulkner on 1 May 1889. The High Street end was re-aligned and rebuilt in 1934, and comprised an arcade entrance to the market, shops, and a department store, Hills & Steele.

An extension at the High Street end was opened by Mayor Robert Frank Allen on 25 November 1987. It is a Grade II-Listed building situated in the city centre, owned and operated by Newport City Council.

The market had been subject to plans for redevelopment since 2012. After being closed for a year, a modernised and refurbished version of the market was re-opened in March 2022.

Facilities
Entrances to the market are located in Upper Dock Street (Market Square), High Street, Market Street and Griffin Street.

Prior to its redevelopment in the 2020s, the market houses over 100 stalls over two floors offering a variety of fresh produce and stock. Stalls included a butchers, greengrocers, a fishmonger, a traditional confectioner's stall as well as being home to Newport's Welsh shop, Newport Welsh Gifts. An eclectic selection of Art and Craft stalls, coffee shops and hairdressers were located upstairs alongside the Jerome Gatehouse Collection Military band archive and a huge matchstick model of the Newport Transporter Bridge. The market also housed a Business Centre on the upper floors.

The newly refurbished (2022) market includes market stalls, a food hall and bar on the ground floor. Rae Barton Fruit and Veg, who had been in the market for more than a century, retained its spot. Friendly Neighbourhood Comics also returned. Toy and ornament seller, City Treasures, relocated from Commercial Street. Other stalls included a candle shop, home decor stall, pet food shop, sustainable soap eco-shop and a vintage clothes shop.
 
Food and drink outlets include Deli Bach, Dirty Gnocchi, Meat and Greek, Rogue Welsh Cake Company, Seven Lucky Gods and The Greedy Bear. The space also includes 70 workspaces, a gym and a roof garden.

Redevelopment 
In April 2012 a £750,000 refurbishment scheme was approved by the Welsh Government, to upgrade and improve the layout and facilities. This was to be funded by a regeneration company, Newport Unlimited.

In 2018, developers Loft Co announced that Newport City Council approved their plans for a 250-year development lease with the council, subject to contracts, for a "24-hour working/living space with a tech hub, apartments and performance space while retaining market units and a food hall." Loft Co are designing the plans along the style of their previous work on Cardiff's Tramshed, Barry's and Porthcawl's Jennings Building. Newport City Council provided their approval in 2018. In 2019 it was subject to a planning application for a £12m scheme to provide a mixed use site with a tech hub, apartments, market units, as well as restaurants.

Only a few of the stallholders, about 5 of 35, planned to return after the development.

The refurbishment cost between £5 million and £6 million. The market was officially reopened by Newport City Council leader, Jane Mudd, at a ceremony on Thursday 17 March 2022.

References

See also

Newport Market

Culture in Newport, Wales

Food markets in the United Kingdom
Shopping in Newport, Wales
Grade II listed buildings in Newport, Wales
Retail markets in Wales
Commercial buildings completed in 1889
Tourist attractions in Newport, Wales
Landmarks in Newport, Wales
History of Newport, Wales
1810s establishments in Wales